The Moscow Summit was a summit meeting between U.S. President Ronald Reagan and General Secretary of the Communist Party of the Soviet Union Mikhail Gorbachev. It was held on May 29, 1988 – June 3, 1988.  Reagan and Gorbachev finalized the Intermediate-Range Nuclear Forces Treaty (INF) after the U.S. Senate's ratification of the treaty in May 1988. Reagan and Gorbachev continued to discuss bilateral issues like Central America, Southern Africa, the Middle East and the pending withdrawal of Soviet troops from Afghanistan. Reagan and Gorbachev continued their discussions on human rights. The parties signed seven agreements on lesser issues such as student exchanges and fishing rights.  A significant result was the updating of Soviet history books, which necessitated cancelling some history classes in Soviet secondary schools.  In the end, Reagan expressed satisfaction with the summit.

Reagan and Gorbachev eventually issued a joint statement, of which excerpts are shown here:

One ironic instance of the summit was when Reagan gave Gorbachev a copy of the movie Friendly Persuasion, whose screenwriter Michael Wilson got blacklisted in the 1950s due to suspected communist sympathies.

See also 
List of Soviet Union–United States summits (1943 to 1991)

References

20th-century diplomatic conferences
1988 in international relations
1988 in the Soviet Union
1988 in Moscow
1988 conferences
May 1988 events in Europe
June 1988 events in Europe
Cold War
Diplomatic conferences in the Soviet Union
Soviet Union–United States diplomatic conferences
United States presidential visits
Articles containing video clips
Presidency of Ronald Reagan